Prajatantrik Shakti Party is a political party in Nepal. The party is registered with the Election Commission of Nepal ahead of the 2008 Constituent Assembly election. The party supports a constitutional monarchy.

References

Monarchist parties in Nepal